Todd Patterson Haymore is an American civil servant who served as Virginia Secretary of Commerce and Trade in the administration of Governor Terry McAuliffe. He previously served as the Virginia Secretary of Agriculture and Forestry under Governor Bob McDonnell and Terry McAuliffe. Prior to these two posts, he served in then-Governor Tim Kaine's administration in the Virginia Department of Agriculture and Consumer Services.

In March 2018, he was appointed as Managing Director of the Global Economic Development, Commerce and Government Relations Group, based in the Richmond, Virginia office of Hunton Andrews Kurth.

Education 
Haymore received his Bachelor of Arts Degree in Political Science from the University of Richmond, and his Masters of Business Administration from Virginia Commonwealth University. Haymore also completed training at the Performance Management Group's Virginia Executive Institute at Virginia Commonwealth University. In December 2016, during fall commencement ceremonies, VCU awarded Haymore an Honorary Doctorate of Humane Letters for his contributions to Virginia in economic development and global trade promotion.

Career

Government 
Haymore began his professional career as a legislative intern to former Virginia State Senator Onico Barker, and later served as a legislative assistant and communications director to Lewis F. Payne Jr. Haymore served as Commissioner of the Virginia Department of Agriculture & Consumer Services under Governor Tim Kaine. In 2010, Haymore became Virginia's second Agriculture and Forestry Secretary, and was later re-appointed to the position by Governor McAuliffe in 2014. Haymore was appointed Secretary of Commerce and Trade by Governor Terry McAuliffe in September 2016.

Business 
Haymore was an executive at both Universal Leaf Tobacco Corporation and Alliance One International, two of the world's largest leaf tobacco dealers.

Personal life 
A native of Danville, Virginia, Haymore is married to Margaret Cary Lewis. They have three children. The Haymore family resides in Henrico County.

References

External links
 Virginia Secretary of Commerce and Trade

Living people
1969 births
State cabinet secretaries of Virginia
University of Richmond alumni
Virginia Commonwealth University alumni
Politicians from Danville, Virginia
People from Henrico County, Virginia